The southern brown-throated weaver (Ploceus xanthopterus) is a species of bird in the family Ploceidae.
It is found in southern Africa.

Gallery

References

External links
 Southern brown-throated weaver -  Species text in Weaver Watch.
 Southern brown-throated weaver - Species text in The Atlas of Southern African Birds.

southern brown-throated weaver
Birds of East Africa
southern brown-throated weaver
Taxonomy articles created by Polbot